The Legend of the Legendary Heroes is an anime television series adapted from the light novels of the same title by Takaya Kagami and Saori Toyota. Produced by Zexcs and directed by Itsuro Kawasaki, the series was broadcast from July 10, 2010 to December 16, 2010 on TV Tokyo for 24 episodes. The series follows the adventures of Ryner Lute, a student of the Roland Empire Royal Magician's Academy who sets out on a journey to search for the relics of a "Legendary Hero", accompanied by the local swordswoman Ferris Eris. However, the two soon discover that a deadly curse is spreading throughout the continent.

The first DVD and Blu-ray compilation was released in Japan on October 22, 2010. In 2010, Funimation licensed the series for an English simulcast release.

Four pieces of theme music were used: two opening themes and two ending themes. For the first 12 episodes, the opening theme is titled  performed by Aira Yuhki, and the ending theme, "Truth Of My Destiny", is performed by Ceui. The second opening and ending themes, used for the remainder of the series are "Last Inferno" performed by Ceui and  performed by Ayahi Takagaki, respectively.

Episodes list

References

Legend of the Legendary Heroes, The